Ponmanam is a 1998 Indian Tamil-language drama film directed by debutant S. P. Rajkumar and produced by V. Natarajan. The film stars Prabhu, Suvalakshmi and Priya Raman. It was released on 14 January 1998 coinciding with Thai Pongal, and ran for 100 days in a couple of theaters.

Plot 

Anandhan (Prabhu), a kind-hearted singer, has a wife Maheshwari (Suvalakshmi) and a baby boy. He lives in a house leased by Naidu (Manivannan). Kumar (Karan), a youth who supposed to work in a bank, moves into a new house near Anandhan's house. Poornima (Priya Raman), a middle-class family woman, quarrels with Anandhan on multiple occasions.

One day, Poornima tells Anandhan about her bitter past. When Poornima's family were in Sri Lanka, a bomb killed Poornima's mother, amputated her sister's legs and blinded her another sister. Now, Poornima had to work hard to support her family. After hearing her past, Anandhan becomes Poornima's friend but Poornima falls in love with him. Kumar then proposes his love to Maheshwari because Anandhan revealed to him that they were not married.

In the past, Anandhan was a jobless graduate and was from a poor family. Anandhan's sister Shanthi eloped with her lover. Later, Anandhan's parents cannot digest it and they hung themselves. So Anandhan attempted to suicide in turn but there, he saved Maheshwari and her nephew from drowning. Her brother-in-law killed her sister and Maheshwari had to escape with her sister's baby. To face the troubles, they decided to live together without marrying.

Poornima's boss (Nizhalgal Ravi) wants to marry Poornima, her father accepts and begs Anandhan to forget his daughter. Anandhan lies to Poornima that he never loves her and then she challenges to marry another man. Poornima marries her boss and Anandhan is humiliated during the wedding. Maheshwari and Kumar then marry and leave the city. Meanwhile, Anandhan finds himself alone again and decides to raise Maheshwari's nephew.

Cast

Soundtrack 

The film score and the soundtrack were composed by S. A. Rajkumar. The soundtrack, released in 1998, features 5 tracks with lyrics written by Kamakodiyan, Ilandevan, Arivumathi and Pazhani Bharathi.

Reception 
P. Balan of Indolink.com rated the film 2.5 out to 5 and stated that : "a good movie to watch". A critic from Screen noted "the family drama highlighted by an excellent performance by Prabhu, has been attracting family audiences and even though the collections are not 100 per cent, the trade expects it to emerge a winner after a slow start."

References 

1998 films
1990s Tamil-language films
Films directed by S. P. Rajkumar